Arthur E. Meyer (born February 2, 1890) was an American college football and basketball player and coach. He served as the head football coach at Wisconsin State Normal School at Oshkosh—now known as the University of Wisconsin–Oshkosh—from 1912 to 1917, compiling a record of 12–25–1. Meyer played college football at Marquette University under head coach William Juneau.

Head coaching record

References

1890 births
Year of death missing
American men's basketball players
Marquette Golden Avalanche football players
Marquette Golden Eagles men's basketball players
Wisconsin–Oshkosh Titans football coaches